Ivan Dmitrievich Sednev (1885 – 1918), was a Russian sailor.  He was the personal servant of the Imperial children of Tsar Nicholas II of Russia. 

He originally served as a sailor of the imperial yacht. He served the former Imperial family during their exile in Siberia during the Russian revolution. He was killed shortly before the Execution of the Romanov family.

References

1885 births
1918 deaths
Court of Nicholas II of Russia
Russian sailors
People of the Russian Revolution